Pedoulas is a village in the Nicosia District of Cyprus, located at an altitude of  in the Troodos Mountains, 4 km south of Moutoullas. It lies in Marathasa Valley. The name is derived from the words pediada (valley) and laos (people). It is popular summer resort.

Churches

Pedoulas is known for its 12 churches, varying from a 15th-century chapel to a 1930s cathedral. The most important is the Archangelos Michael (Archangel Michael) church, which is a UNESCO World Heritage Site along with nine other Painted Churches in the Troödos Region. It is built in 1474.

Church of Holy Cross (Timios Stavros), main church of Pedoulas, was built between 1933 and 1935. Most important relic of Church of Holy Cross is a crucifix containing a piece of the Holy Cross, which was brought from Constantinople. Church replaced old timber-roofed church and keeps icons and parts of iconostasis from 16th century. On top of one hill 1986. was built 25m high Holy Cross, standing near one chapel. Not far from Holy Cross there is a monument built to honor Michalis Stivaros and all killed in the Balkan Wars. Monument is built in 2011 by Athanasios Ktorides Foundation.

Museums

Pedoulas has two museums: the Byzantine Museum, opened in 1999, and the Folklore Museum, opened in 2005. Byzantine Museum is situated near the Archangel Michael church and houses very important icons and relics from the 13th to 20th century.

References

External links

Communities in Nicosia District